South Andaman Island is the southernmost island of the Great Andaman and is home to the majority of the population of the Andaman Islands.
It belongs to the South Andaman administrative district, part of the Indian union territory of Andaman and Nicobar Islands. It is the location of Port Blair, capital of the Andaman and Nicobar Islands.

History
South Andaman Island was struck by the 2004 Indian Ocean earthquake, leading to many deaths on the island.

Geography
The island belongs to the Great Andaman Chain.
Some areas of the island are restricted areas for non-Indians; however, transit permits can be obtained from the Home Ministry.  
South Andaman is the third largest island in the island group. It is located immediately south of Middle Andaman Island and Baratang, from which it is separated only by a narrow channel, a few hundred meters wide.
South Andaman is less mountainous than the more northerly of the Andaman Islands.

Administration
Politically, South Andaman Island has the tehsils of Ferrargunj and Port Blair.

Demographics 
Port Blair, the capital of the islands, is located on the southern part of this island. 
Other big cities are : Bambooflat, Prothrapur, and Garacharma.
North Andaman had a population of 209,602 at the 2011 census. The population for the whole of the Andaman and Nicobar Islands was 356,152 in 2001.
The effective literacy rate (i.e. the literacy rate of population excluding children aged 6 and below) is 80.6%.

Tourism 
South Andaman plays very important role in Tourism sector as it serves as an entry point for Andamans. 
There are many tour operator or travel agency in port blair. One of the best Travel Agency is Travel in Andaman

References 

 
Islands of South Andaman district